Sarah Vaughan and the Jimmy Rowles Quintet is a 1974 live album by Sarah Vaughan, accompanied by pianist Jimmy Rowles and his quintet.

The song "Morning Star" was mistakenly attributed in the liner notes of the album to W. C. Handy, but was actually written by Rowles and lyricist Johnny Mercer.

Reception

The AllMusic review by Ken Dryden stated that Rowles proves himself to be "a consummate accompanist," and Vaughan is "in her usual outstanding form."

Track listing
 "The Folks Who Live On the Hill" (Oscar Hammerstein II, Jerome Kern) - 4:50
 "That Face" (Alan Bergman, Lew Spence) - 7:55
 "That Sunday, That Summer" (Joe Sherman, George David Weiss) - 4:33
 "A House Is Not a Home" (Burt Bacharach, Hal David) - 5:10
 "Frasier (The Sensuous Lion)" (Jimmy Rowles, Johnny Mercer) - 4:20
 "Morning Star" (Rowles, Mercer) - 6:43

Personnel
Sarah Vaughan - vocals
Jimmy Rowles - piano
Al Aarons - trumpet
Teddy Edwards - tenor saxophone
Monty Budwig - double bass
Donald Bailey - drums

References

Mainstream Records albums
Sarah Vaughan live albums
1974 live albums